Kennedy Mountain is an 11,433-foot-elevation (3,485 meter) summit located in Fresno County, California, United States. It is situated in Kings Canyon National Park, on Monarch Divide which is west of the crest of the Sierra Nevada mountain range. Mount Harrington is four miles to the west along the divide, and Kennedy Pass less than a mile east. The first ascent of the summit was made by a 1903 USGS survey party, and likely named for one of the agency's employees. Inclusion on the Sierra Peaks Section peakbagging list generates climbing interest. This landform's toponym has been officially adopted by the U.S. Board on Geographic Names.

Climate
According to the Köppen climate classification system, Kennedy Mountain is located in an alpine climate zone. Most weather fronts originate in the Pacific Ocean, and travel east toward the Sierra Nevada mountains. As fronts approach, they are forced upward by the peaks (orographic lift), causing them to drop their moisture in the form of rain or snowfall onto the range. Precipitation runoff from this mountain drains into tributaries of the Kings River.

See also
 
 List of mountain peaks of California

References

External links
 Weather forecast: Kennedy Mountain

Mountains of Fresno County, California
North American 3000 m summits
Mountains of Northern California
Sierra Nevada (United States)
Mountains of Kings Canyon National Park